HMAS Sirocco (Q21) was a channel patrol boat operated by the  Naval Auxiliary Patrol of the Royal Australian Navy (RAN) during World War II. 

Sirocco was destroyed by fire and burnt to the waterline at Hobart on 26 January 1942.

References

Patrol vessels of the Royal Australian Navy
Maritime incidents in January 1942